The 1909 Rangitikei by-election was a by-election held during the 17th New Zealand Parliament in the Rangitikei electorate of the North Island. This was the sixth by-election since the Rangitikei electorate was established for the 1861 election. The previous by-election took place in 1892 and the following one took place in 1978. The Second Ballot Act 1908 was in force and in the first ballot, and Frank Hockly of the opposition Reform Party won the first ballot, but Robert William Smith of the governing Liberal Party was ultimately chosen in the second ballot.

Background
The by-election was caused after the death of Liberal Party MP Arthur Remington on 17 August 1909. Remington died at his home in Tinakori Road, Wellington, at the age of 53.

Six candidates were announced on 9 September for the by-election: Frank Hockly and George Hutchison were candidates for the opposition, Robert Hornblow was a candidate for Liberal–Labour, James Georgetti was an independent, and Robert Smith and William Meldrum were candidates for the Liberal Party. However, ultimately George Hutchison did not appear on the ballot as he agreed to stand down in the interests of the Reform Party in favour of Hockly.

The Second Ballot Act 1908 was in force and had previously been used for the 1908 election. This was the second by-election where it applied, and the act stipulated that the leading candidate had to obtain an absolute majority of the votes, or else the two highest polling candidates would face each other in a second election. No candidate received an absolute majority in the first ballot on 17 September and consequently a second ballot took place on 23 September.

Results
The following tables give the election results:

First ballot

Hockly received a plurality of votes, receiving 1,548 votes of the total of 4,179. Meldrum was expected to receive the votes from those in favour of the Liberal Government, however Smith ultimately came in second place. As no candidate received a majority, a second ballot took place one week later.

Second ballot

The second ballot resulted in the return of Liberal candidate Smith, who was elected by a majority of 399 votes. Despite the in-fighting from Government candidates in the first ballot, they stood faithfully in favour of Smith for the second ballot. Thomas Mackenzie, who at the time served as Minister of Agriculture, attributed the victory to "a recognition on the part of the electors that the Government is honestly striving to do its very best in the interests of the country" and took the rural vote of the electorate to be an approval of his ministry's work.

Results by locality
Following are two tables showcasing the detailed results by locality for each of the two ballots.

First ballot

Second ballot

See also
List of New Zealand by-elections
Rangitikei by-election (disambiguation), other by-elections for the Rangitikei electorate

Notes

References

Rangitikei 1909
1909 elections in New Zealand
Politics of Rangitikei